George “Crime79” Ibañez (b. New York, New York December 31, 1964) is a famous New York City-based graffiti artist. He was introduced to graffiti art while attending Franklin K. Lane High School and began painting subways at age 13 in the East New York section of Brooklyn. While continuing with his subway art, Ibañez was named Class Artist and received the Art Students League of New York Gold Medal. He then studied at the School of Visual Arts.

From 1977 to 1984, Crime79 painted numerous notable subway cars. A whole train with a memorable painted poem appears as the opening page to the “Graffiti Bible”, Subway Art  by Martha Cooper and Henry Chalfant.

Crime79 was a member of a group called “Soul Artists” which were among the first to transition graffiti art from subways to legitimate galleries. Crime79’s first show of paintings was at the Rainbow Gallery in New York City’s SoHo District in 1983. His works were regarded as, “simply the best pieces in the show” (ArtSpeak Magazine, Volume V, June 1983). In 2009 two of his paintings were sold at the prestigious Millon & Associés Auction House in Paris, France.

In addition to paintings, Crime79 practices his art on intriguing projects in a variety of mediums, including:

 Designed the album cover for DJ Tony Touch entitled “Crime79” (2004)
 Commissioned by recording artist LL Cool J to create a mural backdrop for the video “Hush”  (2004)
 In 2006 Crime79 was chosen to design a wrapper for a limited edition of his own chocolate bar, “Caramel Crime”  which today is sold in exclusive chocolate stores and art museums including MoMA, Philadelphia Museum of Art and chocolatebarnyc.com.
 Recently commissioned to paint a canvas for Rev Run’s (of Run-D.M.C.) son Diggy Simmons for his MTV reality show, “Run’s House.”

Crime79’s works are documented in documentaries, music videos, video games (“The Warriors”) and international publications worldwide including The Source Magazine, Mugshot Magazine, ARTnews, Elemental Magazine, Print, Warp Magazine, New York Daily News, Stress Magazine, The Village Voice, BET Television, Alarm Magazine, Piece Book and many others.

References

Graffiti Bible 

Subway Art 

ArtNet.com Listing 

AskArt.com Listing 

Hush Video 

Caramel Crime Bar

External links

Artists’ Website 

Subway Outlaws Interview 

Artnet Artists Directory 

AskART, The Artists’ Bluebook 

Chocolate Bar NYC 

LL Cool J “Hush” Video 

Diggy Simmons “Life of the Jet Setter” 

1964 births
Living people
American graffiti artists
School of Visual Arts alumni